Patrick Bourdais (born 16 September 1954) is a retired French racing driver.
He is the father of Sébastien Bourdais, who competed in many categories, including Formula One.

Racing record

Complete 24 Hours of Le Mans results

References

1954 births
Living people
French racing drivers
24 Hours of Le Mans drivers
Place of birth missing (living people)

Larbre Compétition drivers